Black Sun may refer to:

Film and television
 Black Sun (1964 film), a film directed by Koreyoshi Kurahara
 Black Sun (2005 film), a documentary film
 Black Sun (2007 film),  a film directed by Krzysztof Zanussi and starring Valeria Golino
 Black Sun: The Nanking Massacre, a 1994 film
 "Black Sun", an episode of Space: 1999
 Balkan Shadows, also known as Black Sun, a TV series produced by Dragan Bjelogrlić

Literature
 Black Sun (Abbey novel), a 1971 novel by Edward Abbey
 Black Sun, a 1974 short story by Dennis Etchison
 Black Sun (Kristeva book), a 1989 book by Julia Kristeva
 Black Sun (Goodrick-Clarke book), a 2002 nonfiction book by Nicholas Goodrick-Clarke
 Black Sun (Twining novel), a 2005 novel by James Twining
 Black Sun (manga), a manga first published in 2007, written and illustrated by Uki Ogasawara
 Black Sun, an Afrofuturism graphic novel series first published in 2018, written and illustrated by Kelvin Nyeusi Mawazo
 Black Sun (Roanhorse novel), a 2020 fantasy novel by Rebecca Roanhorse
 Black Sun, a comic series published by Wildstorm
 Black Sun: The Brief Transit and Violent Eclipse of Harry Crosby, a 1976 book by Geoffrey Wolff
 Black Sun Press
 The Black Sun, a 1966 novel by Lance Horner and Kyle Onstott
 The Black Sun, a 1997 novel by Jack Williamson
 The Black Sun: The Alchemy and Art of Darkness, a 2005 book by Stanton Marlan

Music 
 Black Sun Ensemble
 Black Sun Empire, a Dutch drum and bass group
 Blacksun Festival, a music festival

Albums
 Black Sun (Leessang album)
 Black Sun (Primal Fear album)
 Black Sun (Ra album)
 Black Sun, a 2011 LP by Kode9 & the Spaceape
 Black Sun, a 2011 EP by Natalie McCool

Songs
 "Black Sun", by Dead Can Dance from Aion, 1990
 "Black Sun", by the Cult from The Cult, 1994
 "Black Sun", by Therion from Vovin, 1998
 "Black Sun", by NON from Children of the Black Sun, 2002
 "Black Sun", by Darkest Hour from The Eternal Return, 2009
 "Black Sun" (Death Cab for Cutie song), from Kintsugi, 2015
 "A Black Sun", by Gary Numan from Intruder (Gary Numan album), 2021
 "Black Hole Sun", by Soundgarden from Superunknown, 1994

Other uses
 Black Sun (alchemy), the sun in hermetic and alchemic study
 Black Sun (symbol), used by neo-Nazis and other far-right groups
 Black Sun (sculpture), a sculpture by Isamu Noguchi
 Black Sun (Star Wars), a crime syndicate in the Star Wars universe
 Black Sun Lodge, a Chartered local body of Ordo Templi Orientis
 Blaxxun or Black Sun, a former virtual reality 3D chat platform
 Cyric or the Black Sun, a god in the Forgotten Realms universe
 Kamen Rider Black (character) or Black Sun
 Black Sun, an object in The City and the Stars
 Black Sun, a virtual nightclub in Snow Crash
 Black Sun, a weapon in Supreme Commander
 Black sun, a solarization effect in photography due to extreme overexposure

See also
 Black Star (disambiguation)
 Black hole (disambiguation)
 Dark Star (disambiguation)
 Dark Sun (disambiguation)
 Schwarze Sonne (disambiguation)
 Solar eclipse, astronomical phenomenon
 Sort Sol (band), a Danish band
 Sort sol (bird flock), a seasonal flocking of birds